Vaughan Bank is a submarine bank in the Balleny Islands area. It was named for V. J. Vaughan, Commanding Officer, USS Glacier used in the U.S./New Zealand Balleny Island Expedition (1965). Name approved 4/80 (ACUF 201).

References

Undersea banks of the Southern Ocean